David Chaussinand (born 19 April 1973 in Clermont-Ferrand, Auvergne) is a retired male hammer thrower from France. He set his personal best (80.99 metres) on 19 August 2001 at a meet in Rüdlingen.

Doping
Chaussinand tested positive for metenolone and clenbuterol in 2002 and received a three-year ban.

Achievements

See also
List of doping cases in athletics

References

hammerthrow.wz

1973 births
Living people
French male hammer throwers
Athletes (track and field) at the 2000 Summer Olympics
Olympic athletes of France
Doping cases in athletics
French sportspeople in doping cases
Sportspeople from Clermont-Ferrand